The Shikoku proportional representation block was one of 11 multi-member districts (and 311 districts overall) that were contested at the general election for the House of Representatives in the Japanese National Diet on 16 December 2012. Six seats were available for election via open party lists. The Liberal Democratic Party (LDP) won the election in a landslide, which returned former Prime Minister Shinzo Abe to power. In the Shikoku PR block, the LDP won two of the six seats with 30.7% of the vote.

Voters who participated in the election cast one ballot for the proportional block and a separate ballot for one of the 13 smaller single-member districts that are located within Shikoku.

Results

Prior to the election, the ruling Democratic Party of Japan (DPJ) held three of the six PR block seats as well as 5 of the 13 small electorates that make up the block. The opposition LDP held 2 of the PR seats and the 8 remaining electorates, while their traditional junior coalition partner Komeito held the final PR seat.

The 2012 general election delivered a landslide victory to the LDP, with 294 of the 480 seats won at the national level. The election decimated the DPJ from a pre-election position of 230 to just 57 seats. In the Shikoku PR block, the DPJ lost 2 of their seats as their vote was reduced to 16.0%, down from 43.2% in the 2009 election. Junya Ogawa lost his seat in Kagawa 1st district but was the DPJ candidate to suffer the narrowest defeat, so he was able to retain a seta in the house. The newly-formed Japan Restoration Party gained the two seats lost by the DPJ. In the 13 single-member electorates, the LDP gained 4 seats, with Yuichiro Tamaki being the only DPJ member to retain his seat in the Kagawa 2nd district.

Party lists

Liberal Democratic Party

Democratic Party of Japan

Japan Restoration Party

Komeito

Japanese Communist Party

Your Party

Tomorrow Party of Japan

Social Democratic Party

Happiness Realization Party

References

General elections in Japan